Wanda Wąsowska (born 28 June 1931) is a Polish equestrian. She was born in Niemojewo in Włocławek County. She competed in dressage at the 1980 Summer Olympics in Moscow, where she placed fourth in the team competition.

References

External links

1931 births
Living people
People from Włocławek County
Polish female equestrians
Polish dressage riders
Olympic equestrians of Poland
Equestrians at the 1980 Summer Olympics
Sportspeople from Kuyavian-Pomeranian Voivodeship